Wretches is a 2018 South Korean drama film written and directed by  Kim Baek-jun.

Synopsis
The movie with someone entering the school after hours tapering a student locker. The most powerful student at a school is hospitalized after drinking a drink from the locker which has been poisoned. Yang-Hoon (Lee Yi-Kyung) then takes over his #1 position at school. Yang-Hoon harasses Jae-Young (Lee Won-Geun) and it gets worse. One day, Yang-Hoon, who has a crush on Bo-Young (Park Gyu-Young), gets Jae-Young to follow her.

Cast
 Lee Won-keun as Jo Jae-young  
 Lee Yi-kyung as Yang-hun
 Park Gyu-young as Ye-ri / Bo-kyung
 Oh Seung-hoon as Sang-cheol 
 Chae Sang-woo as Seong-woo
 Chu Kwi-jung as Jae-young's mother
 Kim Sung-kyun as Inspector Kang (special appearance)
 Kim Ho-jung as Ye-ri's mother (special appearance)

Release
In South Korea, the film was given a restricted rating by the Korea Media Rating Board.

References

External links
 
 

2018 films
South Korean drama films
Films about school violence
2018 drama films
2010s South Korean films